Strong Voices TV (SVTV) Network is a subscription-based television network that represents LGBTQ community, its allies, and advocates.  It features videos, movies, film, podcasts, music, and video games, from members of the LGBT community. It offers a digital library that includes the licensing and production of diverse genres including series, movies, documentaries, podcasts, music, reality series, short films, news, sports, live streaming events, and is soon to include LGBT animation. Along with featuring media products produced by a diverse community, SVTV Network produces its own original series and content.  The subscription-based network was started by Sheri Johnson, a full-time seventh-grade teacher and creator of the web series “StudvilleTV”.

History 
SVTV's founder Sheri Johnson is also the creator of the web series “StudvilleTV” that had 100,000 subscribers in 39 countries and got 5 million views. Johnson and other creators allege a shift in policies and regulations at YouTube discriminated against LGBTQ indie filmmakers resulting in declining ad revenue for their content. In response to partnered advertisers believing themselves to be an unsuitable match for LGBTQ content creators, Johnson decided to create a platform for herself and for the LGBTQ community.

Establishment 
The SVTV Network officially launched its 'On Demand' network in the Fall of 2016 as a website and app combination.

Flagship Shows

StudvilleTV 
Created by Sheri Johnson in 2013, the series StudvilleTV ran for four seasons on Youtube.  "Based on the lives of Johnson and her three best friends — was relatable, fun, serious, and true. The series explored their lives as lesbians — dating, juggling careers and maneuvering through life together."

Stud Model Project 
In the same vein as the America's Next Top Model, the first show of its kind in the history of television, “Stud Model Project: The Series” is a new reality competition searching for America’s sexiest LGBTQ Stud model. The show "disrupts the labels and gender norms within the LGBTQ community." The mission of the series is to break barriers, and deconstruct the labels placed on the dominants within the LGBTQ community., the show aims to normalize non-binary gender.

References

External links
Strong Voices TV Network

Television networks in the United States
LGBT-related mass media in the United States
LGBT-related television channels
Television channels and stations established in 2016
2016 establishments in the United States